Far East Organization is one of the largest private real estate developers in Singapore. It has businesses in property development, retail, hospitality, and food and beverage brands in Asia and Australia. The company was founded by the late Singaporean billionaire Ng Teng Fong in 1960. It is currently managed by Philip Ng, whose brother Robert runs the Hong Kong-based sister company Sino Group. The two refer to Far East Organization as a Christian enterprise.

Far East Organization operates in Singapore, Hong Kong, China, Malaysia, and Australia. It has three publicly listed subsidiaries: Far East Orchard Limited, Yeo Hiap Seng Limited, and Far East Hospitality Trust.

History 
Far East Organization’s first residential project was 72 terrace houses in Jalan Pacheli in Serangoon Gardens. The project was completed in 1962. 

After developing a series of residential developments in the 1960s, the company diversified into retail, starting with Far East Shopping Centre on Orchard Road in 1974. This was followed by the completion of other shopping and office developments in the prime Orchard Road area, including Lucky Plaza (1978), Orchard Plaza (1981), Far East Plaza (1983), and Claymore Plaza (1984).

In 1987, the company acquired a majority stake in the publicly-listed Ming Court Hotel Limited (renamed Orchard Parade Holdings Limited in 1991). The acquisition included the Ming Court Hotel, which was renamed The Orchard Parade Hotel. Orchard Parade Holdings was restructured in 2012 to become Far East Orchard. 

In 1995, the company acquired a majority stake in Yeo Hiap Seng, a Singaporean beverage company. The company launched the luxury development brand Inessence in 2010 and lifestyle real estate development brand Far East SOHO in 2011.

In 2012, Far East Organization listed the Far East Hospitality Trust on the Singapore Exchange.

In 2013, it entered the Australian market through acquisitions and partnerships with The Straits Trading Company and Toga Group.  It also acquired several retail and commercial developments. 

In October 2019, the company opened The Fullerton Hotel Sydney which occupies Sydney’s former General Post Office, built in 1874. 

Two new businesses, Store-Y—a self-storage facility— and Agape Laundry—a centralised commercial laundry service—were established in 2017.

In 2020,  Far East Hospitality expanded for the first time into overseas territories with the acquisition of Village Hotel Ariake Tokyo in Japan.

Notable Projects

Shopping Malls 
Orchard Central is a shopping mall by Far East Organization located along the main shopping belt at Orchard Road. It sits on the land previously occupied by an open air carpark and has a 160m frontage along Orchard Road. It was officially opened on 2 July 2009. In December 2016, Forbes recognized Orchard Central as one of the top five shopping malls in Singapore. Discovery Walk on Orchard — which comprises Orchard Central developed by Far East Organization, 313@somerset by LendLease and orchardgateway by OCBC Bank and Great Eastern was awarded the FIABCI Prix d'Excellence Award 2016 World Gold Winner (Retail category).

References

External links
Far East Organization

Real estate companies established in 1960
Real estate companies of Singapore
Sino Group
1960 establishments in Singapore
Singaporean brands